General José Antonio Anzoátegui International Airport  It is the international airport of the city of Barcelona, capital of Estado Anzoátegui. located in the Northeast of the country, in a southwest position of the center of the city of Barcelona, about 4 km away from the urban center of the city. And less than 1 km from the Caribbean Sea, (Atlantic Ocean). It is the headquarters and main hub of the airline Avior Airlines

Facilities
Runway 02/20 length includes a  displaced threshold on Runway 20. Runway 15/33 length includes a  displaced threshold and  overrun on Runway 33.

Airlines and destinations

See also
Transport in Venezuela
List of airports in Venezuela

References

External links

OurAirports - Barcelona
OpenStreetMap - Barcelona
SkyVector - Barcelona

Airports in Venezuela
Buildings and structures in Anzoátegui
Buildings and structures in Barcelona, Venezuela